Jennie is an unincorporated community in Chicot County, Arkansas, United States. The community is four miles south of Lake Village along Arkansas Highway 150. Fairview on Lake Chicot is approximately two miles to the northeast.

References

External links
Jennie at Arkansas Department of Parks and Tourism

Unincorporated communities in Chicot County, Arkansas
Unincorporated communities in Arkansas